Robert Coin Thorne (25 November 1898 – 27 May 1960) was an American paleontologist.

Life
Thorne was born in Ashley, Utah.

He participated at the 2nd Captain Marshall Field Paleontological Expedition in 1926. Other participants were Elmer S. Riggs (Leader and Photographer), Rudolf Stahlecker (Collector) and Felipe Mendez. The expedition started in April 1926 and finished in November 1926. The purpose was geology fossil collecting in Puerta Corral Quemado, Catamarca, Argentina, South America. The expedition was successful, and even new species like Stahleckeria have been found during this collaboration.

He was a veteran of World War I, an experienced outdoors man, mule driver and fossil collector. He was married to Constance and had with her a son, R. Neil Thorne. His letters about the expedition to his wife have 70 years later been published by their son at his own expense.

He died in Vernal, Utah.

References

External links 
 Historic photographs by The Field Museum Library

1898 births
1960 deaths
American paleontologists
People from Utah